Lt.-Col. George Hamilton Grahame Montagu "Buns" Cartwright (23 April 1889 – 4 August 1976) was an English first-class cricketer and soldier.

"Buns" Cartwright, as he was usually known, was educated at Eton and New College, Oxford. He played for Oxford University in 1909 and 1910 but did not win a Blue.

In the First World War he served in France as a lieutenant-colonel in the Coldstream Guards and was mentioned in despatches. After the war he was for a time Patronage Secretary to Lord Birkenhead, when Birkenhead was Lord Chancellor. The duties of the position included assessing young clergymen for their suitability as curates.

Cartwright played a few first-class matches for Free Foresters and Marylebone Cricket Club between the end of the war and 1928. He was Secretary of the Eton Ramblers, the cricket club for Old Etonians, from 1919 to 1955, and President of the club from 1955 until his death in 1976. He was also President of The Cricketer for many years.

He remained a bachelor all his life, but according to E. W. Swanton was "far from unappreciative of female company". In another understatement Swanton noted that Cartwright "was seldom known to withhold any remark that came into his mind".

References

External links
 
 Buns Cartwright at CricketArchive

1889 births
1976 deaths
People from Westminster
People educated at Eton College
Alumni of New College, Oxford
English cricketers
Oxford University cricketers
Free Foresters cricketers
Marylebone Cricket Club cricketers
Gentlemen of England cricketers
Coldstream Guards officers
British Army personnel of World War I